Inger Marianne Larsen (born 27 January 1951 in Kalundborg) is a Danish poet, writer, and novelist.

Life and work
Between 1970 to 1975 Larsen was studying literature and Chinese at the University of Copenhagen, but then made the decision to write full-time.

First poems were published in the magazine Hvedekorn (Wheatgrain) when she was 18, followed by her first poetry collection, Koncentrationer (Concentrations), in 1971. Her writing at this early stage was experimental, giving way to a more engaged, affirmative style, both critical of officialdom and supportive of the underdog from a leftist point of view.

Larsen's first three novels, published between 1989-92, were about a provincial girl's coming of age and partly autobiographical. Since then she has written more novels, as well as books for children and young adults.

Over the years she has been the recipient of many literary awards and prizes. The most recent of these was the Danske Akademis Store Pris (Great Prize of the Danish Academy) in 2022 with the citation: "Since her debut in 1971…her openly political dream world has been a seemingly endless and natural source of power in literature and in the Danish language."

There have been three English selections of Marianne Larsen's poetry from three continents. The first, by Nadia Christensen, appeared in 1982 in the United States, and Robyn Ianssen's selection, Shadow Calendar, followed in Australia in 1995. A third, gathering work from several translators, was published from the UK as A Common Language in 2006.

References

External links
 Marianne Larsen at Litteratursiden.dk with image  
 Marianne Larsen in Den Store Danske Encyklopædi ("The Great Danish Encyclopedia") by May Schack and Marianne Zibrandtsen 
 Marianne Larsen, poems in Danish and English
 Marianne Larsen, poem from ''The Copenhagen Review in Danish and English
 Review of Selected Poems (1982)

1951 births
Living people
People from Kalundborg
Danish women poets
Danish women writers